RMS Mataroa (formerly named the Diogenes) was a 12,341-ton ocean liner built by Harland & Wolff in 1922. She was scrapped in 1957.

In 1945, Mataroa made two famous journeys:
 In August 1945, the Mataroa was chartered to transport from Marseille to Haifa 173 Jewish children of the Œuvre de secours aux enfants (OSE), survivors of the Buchenwald concentration camp, who had family in Palestine. She later transported  survivors of Bergen-Belsen.
 In late December 1945, the Mataroa brought from Greece to Taranto in southern Italy a number of Greek artists and intellectuals Greek aiming to reach Paris, in France, in the context of the Greek civil war. The vast majority were fellows of France. Some of the passengers became internationally recognised artists, scientists or intellectuals, including: architect George Candilis, artists Constantine Andreou & , philosophers Kostas Axelos, Cornelius Castoriadis &  , linguist Emmanuel Kriaras, filmmaker Ado Kyrou, physician Miltiadès Papamiltiadès.<ref>

References

Further reading
 Nelly Andrikopoulou, 2007: Le Voyage du « Mataroa  », Athens: Hestia
 Mimika Cranaki: « Mataroa » à deux voix: Journal d'exil. Bénaki 
 L'Odyssée du Mataroa, soixante-cinq ans après... . Institut français d'Athènes, 20 December 2010
 Michel Koutouzis: "Les voyages du Mataroa". Agoravox, 1 June 2010
 "R.M.S. Mataroa 1922 -1957", New Zealand Maritime Record

World War II merchant ships of the United Kingdom
Greek Civil War
1922 ships